Throughout her career spanning over nearly four decades, American-born Australian actress and producer Nicole Kidman has appeared in numerous film and television projects, as well as in theatre productions. She made her film debut in the Australian drama Bush Christmas in 1983. Four years later, she starred in the television miniseries Bangkok Hilton, for which she received the AACTA Award for Best Lead Actress in a Television Drama. Her breakthrough role was as a married woman trapped on a yacht with a murderer in the 1989 thriller Dead Calm. She followed this with her Hollywood debut opposite Tom Cruise in Tony Scott's auto-racing film Days of Thunder (1990). Her role as a homicidal weather forecaster in Gus Van Sant's crime comedy-drama To Die For garnered Kidman a Golden Globe Award for Best Actress – Motion Picture Comedy or Musical in 1996. She worked with Cruise again on Ron Howard's Far and Away (1992) and Stanley Kubrick's erotic thriller Eyes Wide Shut in 1999.

Kidman played a courtesan in Baz Luhrmann's 2001 musical Moulin Rouge!, for which she received her second Golden Globe Award and her first nomination for the Academy Award for Best Actress. That same year, she appeared in the horror-thriller The Others, which garnered her a nomination for the BAFTA Award for Best Actress. For her portrayal of writer Virginia Woolf in the drama The Hours (2002), she received the Academy Award for Best Actress, becoming the first Australian to win that award. Following her Oscar win, she starred in Lars von Trier's Dogville, the drama The Human Stain, and the epic war drama Cold Mountain. The following year, she appeared in the sci-fi comedy film The Stepford Wives (2004), and the drama Birth (2004). Four years later, she reunited with Luhrmann on the historical drama Australia. In 2010, she starred in the drama Rabbit Hole, for which she received her third Academy Award nomination for Best Actress.

In 2012, Kidman played novelist Martha Gellhorn in the HBO biopic Hemingway & Gellhorn (2012), for which she received her first Primetime Emmy Award nomination. She then portrayed actress-turned-princess Grace Kelly in the biopic Grace of Monaco (2014) and starred as an evil taxidermist in the comedy Paddington (2014). For her performance in the biographical drama Lion (2016), she received her fourth Academy Award nomination, her first in the Best Supporting Actress category. For producing and starring in the HBO drama series Big Little Lies (2017–2019), she won the Primetime Emmy Award for Outstanding Lead Actress in a Limited Series or Movie and a Primetime Emmy Award for Outstanding Limited Series.

Film

Television

Music videos

Stage

See also
List of awards and nominations received by Nicole Kidman

Notes

References

External links
 

Actress filmographies
Filmography
Australian filmographies
American filmographies